Amstetten (Central Bavarian: Aumstedn or Aumstettn) is a town in Lower Austria. It is the capital of the Amstetten District and the centre of the historical region Mostviertel (“Most” – cider, “viertel” – a quarter of the province Lower Austria).

Geography

History
There are traces of human settlements from the Stone Age and the Bronze Age in the area. The first permanent settlement in the area to be mentioned in written sources was Ulmerfeld, mentioned in 995. The first mention of Amstetten itself is dated to 1111. In 1858, the town was linked to the rest of Austria-Hungary by railroad. Since 1868, it has also been the seat of the local district administration. During World War II, there were two subcamps of the Mauthausen-Gusen concentration camp in Amstetten.  The town was home to Josef Hickersberger.

Population

Local economy 
The Doka Group, a major international producer/supplier of formwork, has their company headquarters in Amstetten.

Schools 
Amstetten has a variety of schools which cater to the needs of its residents, and residents of neighbouring villages. These include a Gymnasium, HLW Amstetten and HAK Amstetten. Language learning in Amstetten is enhanced greatly by the presence of English Language Assistants from the UK and USA, who also run regular extra-curricular events in the local area. There is also a vocational boarding school for technical professions and craftsman education.

Shopping 
Amstetten provides good shopping opportunities for its residents. There is a shopping centre with clothes shops, shoe shops, a supermarket, technology shops and other amenities. The shopping centre also has free WiFi. Amstetten’s high street has some clothes shops and several restaurants. There are two second hand shops in Amstetten where good quality clothes can be purchased cheaply. There are several large supermarkets including an Interspar, Merkur and Hofer.

Culture 
Unfortunately, details of Amstetten’s culture scene are not easily found online. For detailed information of events in Amstetten, the City Hall (Rathaus) can provide programmes and leaflets. Johann Pölz Halle is the local concert hall where school balls, theatre performances and concerts are held.  Amstetten has an annual 'Kulturwochen', a series of weeks in Autumn dedicated to Culture. This includes performances from the Amstetten Symphony Orchestra and local Amateur dramatic groups, as well as professional theatre, cabarets, story-telling, lectures and exhibitions.
In Winter, Amstetten has its own Christmas Market. In Summer, a summer musical theatre made of amateurs and professionals entertains in what is called 'Musicalsummer Amstetten'.

Sights 

Amstetten has several churches. There is a small forest and a river for walking opportunities. There is an indoor and outdoor swimming pool, the 'Naturbad', which is designed to bring the aesthetics of a natural pool into a manmade pool. The pool has a sauna and a slide. There are several gyms in Amstetten as well as a dance and music school.

Nightlife 

Amstetten has several bars and clubs. K1 is in a cellar and is popular among the younger party-goers. There are also two metal bars including the 'Pandora Bar'.

Transport 

Amstetten has a train station that is served by OEBB trains and the Westbahn trains. From the station, there are direct rail services to Linz and Vienna, as well as local tourist attraction Melk.

Twin towns – sister cities

Amstetten is twinned with:
 Alsfeld, Germany (1979)
 Ruelle-sur-Touvre, France (1992)
 Pergine Valsugana, Italy (1999)

Notable people from this town

 Theodor von Frimmel (1853-1928), art historian, musicologist and Beethoven researcher
 Friedl Czepa (1898-1973), actress
 Helene A. von Damm (born 1938), American diplomat
 Josef Fritzl (born 1935), criminal, see Fritzl case
 Jochem Schindler (1944-1994), Indo-Europeanist
 Josef Hickersberger (born 1948), football player and coach
 Erwin Wagenhofer (born 1961), author and filmmaker
 Paulus Hochgatterer (born 1961), writer
 Hermann Fehringer (born 1962), pole vaulter
 Michael Garschall (born 1967, theatre director
 Georg Breinschmid (born 1973), bassist, composer and jazz musician
 Gernot Wagner (born 1980), economist and author
 Michael Klukowski (born 1981), football player
 Daniel Kogler (born 1988), football player

References

Notes

External links

 
Amstetten District
Cities and towns in Amstetten District
Holocaust locations in Austria